The Man from Maisinicu is a 1973 Cuban drama film directed by Manuel Pérez. It was entered into the 8th Moscow International Film Festival where Sergio Corrieri won the award for Best Actor.

Cast
 Mario Balmaseda
 Reynaldo Miravalles
 Miguel Benavides
 Rogelio Blain
 Iván Colas
 Sergio Corrieri
 Enrique Domínguez
 Raúl Eguren
 Enrique Molina

See also 
 List of Cuban films

References

External links
 

1973 films
1973 drama films
1970s Spanish-language films
Cuban black-and-white films
Cuban drama films